The 2016–17 Cornell Big Red men's basketball team represented Cornell University during the 2016–17 NCAA Division I men's basketball season. The Big Red, led by first-year head coach Brian Earl, played their home games at Newman Arena in Ithaca, New York and were members of the Ivy League. They finished the season 8–21, 4–10 in Ivy League play to finish in a three-way tie for last place. They failed to qualify for the inaugural Ivy League tournament.

Previous season 
The Big Red finished the 2015–16 season 10–18, 3–11 in Ivy League play to finish in a tie for seventh place.

On March 14, 2016, Cornell fired head coach Bill Courtney. He finished at Cornell with a six-year record of 60–113. On April 18, the school hired Brian Earl as head coach.

Offseason

Departures

2016 recruiting class

2017 recruiting class

Roster

Schedule and results

|-
!colspan=9 style=| Non-conference regular season

|-
!colspan=9 style=| Ivy League regular season

|-

References

Cornell Big Red men's basketball seasons
Cornell
Cornell Big Red men's basketball
Cornell Big Red men's basketball